Esenbeckia runyonii is a species of flowering tree in the citrus family, Rutaceae, that is native to northeastern Mexico, with a small, disjunct population in the Lower Rio Grande Valley of Texas in the United States. Common names include Limoncillo and Runyon's Esenbeckia. The specific epithet honors Robert Runyon, a botanist and photographer from Brownsville, Texas, who collected the type specimen from a stand of four trees discovered by Harvey Stiles on the banks of Resaca del Rancho Viejo, Texas, in 1929. Conrad Vernon Morton of the Smithsonian Institution received the plant material and formally described the species in 1930. Some consider it a synonym of E. berlandieri Baill. ex Hemsl..

Description
Bark is whitish  except for irregular copper-colored patches that exfoliate to reveal the greenish, lenticel-dotted inner bark, much like American sycamores. The flowers form in broad, terminal panicles and are produced biannually, once in late spring and once in September. Green capsules are distinctively orange scented, while leaves smell like lemons.

Habitat and range
The vast majority of E. runyonii trees occur in Nuevo León, Tamaulipas, San Luis Potosí and northwestern Hidalgo in northeastern Mexico. A few individuals exist in the Tamaulipan mezquital along resacas in the Lower Rio Grande Valley of Texas in the United States. It is possible that this disjunct population arose from seeds dispersed by flooding of the Rio Grande's drainage basin in the Sierra Madre Oriental.

Uses
Post-sized branch cuttings from Limoncillo are planted in the ground during the dry season by farmers in Mexico. Eventually these will take root, forming living fences. Showy foliage and blooms make it an attractive ornamental.

References

External links

runyonii
Plants described in 1930
Trees of Hidalgo (state)
Trees of Northeastern Mexico
Flora of the Rio Grande valleys
Flora of the Sierra Madre Oriental